Isotriphora is a genus of minute sea snails with left-handed shell-coiling, marine gastropod mollusks or micromollusks in the family Triphoridae.

Species
 Isotriphora amethystina B. A. Marshall, 1983
 Isotriphora aureovincta (Verco, 1910)
 Isotriphora disjuncta (Verco, 1909)
 Isotriphora guanahacabibes Rolán & Fernandez-Garcés, 2008
 Isotriphora kurodai Kosuge, 1962
 Isotriphora leo M. Fernandes & Pimenta, 2020
 Isotriphora nivea (Verco, 1909)
 Isotriphora onca M. Fernandes, Pimenta & Leal, 2013
 Isotriphora peetersae (Moolenbeek & Faber, 1989)
 Isotriphora simulata B. A. Marshall, 1983
 Isotriphora taenialba Rolán & Espinosa, 1994
 Isotriphor:a tasmanica (Tenison Woods, 1876)
 Isotriphora tigrina M. Fernandes, Pimenta & Leal, 2013
 Isotriphora tricingulata Rolán & Fernández-Garcés, 2015
 Isotriphora uncia M. Fernandes & Pimenta, 2020
 Isotriphora vercoi B. A. Marshall, 1983
Species brought into synonymy
 Isotriphora bilineata Kosuge, 1962: synonym of Litharium bilineatum (Kosuge, 1962)
 Isotriphora echina Laseron, 1954: synonym of Isotriphora tasmanica (Tenison Woods, 1876)
 Isotriphora guanahacahibes: synonym of Isotriphora guanahacabibes Rolán & Fernandez-Garcés, 2008 (misspelling)

References

External links

 Cotton B.C. & Godfrey F.K. (1931). South Australian Shells. Part I. The South Australian Naturalist. 12(4):51-63, Pls. I-II
 Marshall B.A. (1983) A revision of the Recent Triphoridae of southern Australia. Records of the Australian Museum supplement 2: 1-119

Triphoridae